Sharekhan is an Indian retail brokerage full-service brokerage firm, that , was the fifth largest full-service firm and the 8th largest stock broker in India with 16 lakh customers. Sharekhan was one of the pioneers of online trading in India. It offers a broad range of financial products and services including securities brokerage, mutual fund distribution, loan against shares, Employee Stock Ownership Plan financing, IPO financing and wealth management.

History
Sharekhan was founded by Mumbai-based entrepreneur Shripal Morakhia in 2000. Sharekhan pioneered the Indian online retail brokerage industry and leveraged on the first wave of digitization, when dematerialization (demat) of securities came into effect and electronic trading was introduced in the stock exchanges.

, Sharekhan has 4800+ employees, and was present in over 575 cities through 153 branches, and more than 2,500 business partners. The company had 1.4 million customer base and on an average, executes more than 4 lakh trades per day.

2017 - Acquisition by BNP Paribas
Sharekhan was acquired by BNP Paribas in 2017, it was rebranded as Sharekhan by BNP Paribas.

References

Financial services companies established in 2000
Companies based in Mumbai
Brokerage firms
2000 establishments in Maharashtra
Indian companies established in 2000